In Greek mythology, the name Abas (Ancient Greek: Ἄβας; gen.: Ἄβαντος means "guileless" or "good-hearted") is attributed to several individuals:

Abas, king of Argos.
Abas, son of Poseidon and Arethusa. A Thracian by birth, Abas founded a tribe known as the Abantians or Abantes. Abas and his Abantian followers migrated to the island of Euboea, where he subsequently reigned as king. He was father of Canethus and Chalcodon, and through the latter grandfather of Elephenor, who is known to have accidentally killed him. In some accounts, Abas was also called the father of Canthus (alternatively the son of Canethus and thus, his grandson).
Abas the father of Alcon, Dias, and Arethusa. His son Dias was said to be the founder of the city of Athens in Euboea, naming it after his fatherland.
Abas, son of Metaneira who was changed by Demeter into a lizard, because he mocked the goddess when she had come on her wanderings into the house of his mother, and drank eagerly to quench her thirst. Other traditions relate the same story of a boy, Ascalabus, and call his mother Misme.
Abas, an Argive seer, son of Melampus and Iphianeira. He was the father of Coeranus, Idmon, and Lysimache.
Abas, companion of Perseus.
Abas, a Centaur who attended the wedding of Pirithous and Hippodamia.
Abas, defender of Thebes in the war of the Seven against Thebes. He and his sons Cydon and Argus were killed in the battle.
Abas, a Theban charioteer during the war of the Seven against Thebes. At the beginning of the battle, he is pierced by Pheres with a spear and left groaning for his life.
Abas, son of the Trojan Eurydamas and brother of Polyidus; he fought in the Trojan War and was killed by Diomedes.
Abas, servant of King Lycomedes on the island of Scyros. His job was to keep an eye on shipping traffic from the watchtower and to report directly to the king whether ships arrive at the port. When Odysseus came to the island with his ship to persuade Achilles, who was concealed as a girl, to take part in the War against Troy, the dutiful Abas was the first to report to the king that unknown sails were approaching the coast.
Abas, another defender of Troy, was killed by Sthenelus.
Abas, one of Diomedes' companions, whom Aphrodite turned into a swan.

In the Aeneid, the name Abas belongs to two companions of Aeneas:
Abas, captain whose ship was routed in the storm off Carthage.
Abas, an Etruscan ally from Populonia in the war against the Rutulians and the Latians. He was later on killed by Lausus, the man who led one thousand soldiers from the town of Agylla.

Notes

References 

Antoninus Liberalis, The Metamorphoses of Antoninus Liberalis translated by Francis Celoria (Routledge 1992). Online version at the Topos Text Project.
Apollodorus, The Library with an English Translation by Sir James George Frazer, F.B.A., F.R.S. in 2 Volumes, Cambridge, MA, Harvard University Press; London, William Heinemann Ltd. 1921. ISBN 0-674-99135-4. Online version at the Perseus Digital Library. Greek text available from the same website.
Apollonius Rhodius, Argonautica translated by Robert Cooper Seaton (1853–1915), R. C. Loeb Classical Library Volume 001. London, William Heinemann Ltd, 1912. Online version at the Topos Text Project.
Apollonius Rhodius, Argonautica. George W. Mooney. London. Longmans, Green. 1912. Greek text available at the Perseus Digital Library.
Gaius Julius Hyginus, Fabulae from The Myths of Hyginus translated and edited by Mary Grant. University of Kansas Publications in Humanistic Studies. Online version at the Topos Text Project.
Homer, The Iliad with an English Translation by A.T. Murray, Ph.D. in two volumes. Cambridge, MA., Harvard University Press; London, William Heinemann, Ltd. 1924. . Online version at the Perseus Digital Library.
Homer, Homeri Opera in five volumes. Oxford, Oxford University Press. 1920. . Greek text available at the Perseus Digital Library.
 Parada, Carlos, Genealogical Guide to Greek Mythology, Jonsered, Paul Åströms Förlag, 1993. .
Pausanias, Description of Greece with an English Translation by W.H.S. Jones, Litt.D., and H.A. Ormerod, M.A., in 4 Volumes. Cambridge, MA, Harvard University Press; London, William Heinemann Ltd. 1918. . Online version at the Perseus Digital Library
Pausanias, Graeciae Descriptio. 3 vols. Leipzig, Teubner. 1903.  Greek text available at the Perseus Digital Library
Publius Ovidius Naso, Metamorphoses translated by Brookes More (1859–1942). Boston, Cornhill Publishing Co. 1922. Online version at the Perseus Digital Library.
Publius Ovidius Naso, Metamorphoses. Hugo Magnus. Gotha (Germany). Friedr. Andr. Perthes. 1892. Latin text available at the Perseus Digital Library.
Publius Papinius Statius, The Achilleid translated by Mozley, J H. Loeb Classical Library Volumes. Cambridge, MA, Harvard University Press; London, William Heinemann Ltd. 1928. Online version at the theoi.com
Publius Papinius Statius, The Achilleid. Vol. II. John Henry Mozley. London: William Heinemann; New York: G.P. Putnam's Sons. 1928. Latin text available at the Perseus Digital Library.
Publius Papinius Statius, The Thebaid translated by John Henry Mozley. Loeb Classical Library Volumes. Cambridge, MA, Harvard University Press; London, William Heinemann Ltd. 1928. Online version at the Topos Text Project.
Publius Papinius Statius, The Thebaid. Vol I-II. John Henry Mozley. London: William Heinemann; New York: G.P. Putnam's Sons. 1928. Latin text available at the Perseus Digital Library.
Publius Vergilius Maro, Aeneid. Theodore C. Williams. trans. Boston. Houghton Mifflin Co. 1910. Online version at the Perseus Digital Library.
Publius Vergilius Maro, Bucolics, Aeneid, and Georgics. J. B. Greenough. Boston. Ginn & Co. 1900. Latin text available at the Perseus Digital Library.
Quintus Smyrnaeus, The Fall of Troy translated by Way. A. S. Loeb Classical Library Volume 19. London: William Heinemann, 1913. Online version at theio.com
Quintus Smyrnaeus, The Fall of Troy. Arthur S. Way. London: William Heinemann; New York: G.P. Putnam's Sons. 1913. Greek text available at the Perseus Digital Library.

Stephanus of Byzantium, Stephani Byzantii Ethnicorum quae supersunt, edited by August Meineike (1790-1870), published 1849. A few entries from this important ancient handbook of place names have been translated by Brady Kiesling. Online version at the Topos Text Project.

Children of Poseidon
Metamorphoses into animals in Greek mythology 
Metamorphoses into birds in Greek mythology 
Trojans
Kings in Greek mythology
Centaurs
Argive characters in Greek mythology
Euboean characters in Greek mythology